Bruno Rajaozara (born May 8, 1981) is a Malagasy footballer currently plays for AS Adema.

External links
 

1981 births
Living people
Malagasy footballers
Madagascar international footballers
AS Adema players
Association football goalkeepers